The second series of the British children's television series The Dumping Ground began broadcasting on 10 January 2014 on CBBC and ended on 28 March 2014. The series follows the lives of the children living in the new fictional children's care home of Ashdene Ridge nicknamed by them "The Dumping Ground". It consists of thirteen, thirty-minute episodes. It is the tenth series in The Story of Tracy Beaker franchise.

Series synopsis
The Dumping Ground returned for a second series in January 2014.

Gina Conway (Kay Purcell) and Elektra Perkins (Jessica Revell) did not return in this series. Stacy Liu was introduced as May Li Wang in "Jody in Wonderland" and Kasey McKellar joined the cast in Episode 1, "Kick Off" as cocky Bailey Wharton. This is the first series in all 10 of the Tracy Beaker franchise to include the care home Ashdene Ridge. Jessie Williams left the series as Lily Kettle in Episode 4, "The Barbecue" after moving down South with Shannay and Steve. This series includes a vast majority of plots including Frank becoming homeless and living on the streets, Faith having to deal with her serious injury after being run over by a car, Johnny debated over signing up as a soldier, plus Tyler receiving a visit from his mum. Floss Guppy's past is revealed and whilst Bailey struggles with dyslexia. Johnny and Tee receive a visit from their mum, and Liam O'Donovan returns to the show in the series final. This is the last series with Elly Brewer at the helm and posing as lead writer, despite being in the position since 2010.

Cast

Main

Guest

Casting
The castings of Kasey McKellar as Bailey and Stacy Liu as May-Li were announced in November 2013.

Episodes

References

2014 British television seasons
The Dumping Ground